The United Nations Mercenary Convention, officially the International Convention against the Recruitment, Use, Financing and Training of Mercenaries, is a 2001 United Nations treaty that prohibits the recruitment, training, use, and financing of mercenaries. At the 72nd plenary meeting on 4 December 1989, the United Nations General Assembly concluded the convention as its resolution 44/34. The convention entered into force on 20 October 2001 and has been ratified by 46 states.

The convention extends on the Geneva Conventions Protocol I which in Article 47(1) states that a mercenary cannot be a lawful combatant or prisoner of war.

Article 1 (Definition of mercenary) 
Article 1 of the Convention has the following definition of a mercenary:

Article 2

Article 3

Article 4

Article 5

Article 6

Article 7

Signatories and parties 
As of August 2021, the convention had been ratified by 37 states, and signed but not ratified by 9 states.

Below are the states that have signed, ratified or acceded to the convention.

Several of the states that ratified the agreement are however signatories of the Montreux document which on the contrary of the afore-written convention, does not make illegal the use of mercenaries but gives a document about the use of mercenaries including "good practises", the agreement having no sanctions or legal constraints tied to it.

See also

 Montreux Document – a non-constraining agreement between countries about Mercenary use with a side legal volley about non-military private security.
 Private military company
 Mercenary 
 Unlawful combatant § Mercenaries

References

External links
 Text of the convention, list of signatories
 Procedural history and related documents on the International Convention against the Recruitment, Use, Financing and Training of Mercenaries in the Historic Archives of the United Nations Audiovisual Library of International Law

United Nations treaties
Treaties adopted by United Nations General Assembly resolutions
Treaties concluded in 1989
Treaties entered into force in 2001
Treaties of Armenia
Treaties of Azerbaijan
Treaties of Barbados
Treaties of Belarus
Treaties of Belgium
Treaties of Cameroon
Treaties of Costa Rica
Treaties of Croatia
Treaties of Cuba
Treaties of Cyprus
Treaties of Ecuador
Treaties of Equatorial Guinea
Treaties of Georgia (country)
Treaties of Guinea
Treaties of Honduras
Treaties of Italy
Treaties of Liberia
Treaties of the Libyan Arab Jamahiriya
Treaties of the Maldives
Treaties of Mali
Treaties of Mauritania
Treaties of New Zealand
Treaties of Qatar
Treaties of Peru
Treaties of Moldova
Treaties of Saudi Arabia
Treaties of Senegal
Treaties of Serbia
Treaties of Seychelles
Treaties of Suriname
Treaties of Syria
Treaties of Togo
Treaties of Turkmenistan
Treaties of Ukraine
Treaties of Uruguay
Treaties of Uzbekistan
1989 politics in New York (state)
Treaties of Venezuela